Michael Oliver (born 2 August 1975) is an English former footballer who made 276 appearances in the Football League playing as a midfielder for Stockport County, Darlington and Rochdale in the 1990s and 2000s.

Life and career
Oliver was born in Middlesbrough, and began his career in the youth system of Middlesbrough F.C. He turned professional with the club, but his only first-team appearance came on 16 November 1993, as a substitute in the Anglo-Italian Cup against Ancona. In 1994, he signed for Stockport County; the fee was determined by tribunal. He made his Stockport and Football League debut on 28 February 1995, at the age of 19, as a substitute in a 4–0 defeat at Oxford United in the Second Division, and played in 12 of the remaining 14 matches in the 1994–95 season. He was used infrequently in his second season, was released at its end, and dropped down two divisions to sign for Darlington.

He settled well at Darlington, where he spent four years, and played at least 40 matches in each season in all competitions. His last game for the club was in the 2000 Third Division play-off final defeat to Peterborough United. When his contract expired, he left the club and signed for another Third Division club, Rochdale. He played regularly for two seasons, but his 2002–03 season was disrupted by injury and by disciplinary issues, and he was released at its end.

After leaving Rochdale, Oliver moved into non-league football with Barrow of the Northern Premier League, and went on to play for clubs including Spennymoor United, Thornaby, Bishop Auckland, Newcastle Blue Star, Gateshead, and Durham City.

References

External links
 . The page merges details for two players of the same name: the statistics up to and including Rochdale are for this Michael Oliver, but the personal details and appearances for Clyde are not.

1975 births
Living people
Footballers from Middlesbrough
English footballers
Association football midfielders
Middlesbrough F.C. players
Stockport County F.C. players
Darlington F.C. players
Rochdale A.F.C. players
Barrow A.F.C. players
Spennymoor United F.C. players
Thornaby F.C. players
Bishop Auckland F.C. players
Newcastle Blue Star F.C. players
Gateshead F.C. players
Durham City A.F.C. players
English Football League players
Northern Premier League players
Northern Football League players